Disturbed is the second album by Coo Coo Cal, released on September 18, 2001, through Tommy Boy Records. Most of the album was produced by Bigg Hank, though Bink, DJ Cipha Sounds, Rated X and Kay Gee of Naughty by Nature also contributed production to the album.

Background
The album is perhaps best known for its lead single, "My Projects", which became a minor hit on the Billboard Hot 100, peaking at number 81. It became a bigger hit on the R&B and rap charts, reaching number 22 on the Hot R&B/Hip-Hop Singles & Tracks and topping the Hot Rap Singles chart at number one.

The album itself found mild success on the Billboard charts, reaching 45 on the Billboard 200 and number one on the Top Independent Albums. It sold an estimated 800,000 copies.

Track listing
"Intro" - 1:24
"My Projects" - 3:45
"I Did It Again" - 3:52
"How Does It Feel to Ya" - 4:08 (featuring Koffee Brown)
"Sick and Tired" - 3:53
"Something Something" - 3:59
"Dedication" - 4:28
"Freak Nasty" - 4:11
"Still Ride Till We Die" - 5:24 (featuring Twista)
"Ghetto Dreaming" - 4:07
"Wanna Be a G" - 4:11 (featuring Midwikid)
"My Mind Is Gone" - 3:16
"Disturbed" - 3:57 (featuring Nothing Typical)
"Do You Wanna Ride" - 4:39 (featuring Mocha and Mr. Do It To Death)
"Still in the Game" - 4:09
"My Projects [Remix]" - 4:52 (featuring Trick Daddy & Kurupt)

Chart history

References

2001 albums
Tommy Boy Records albums